Arthur Owen Jensen (5 August 1907 – 5 January 1997) was a New Zealand musician, music tutor and promoter, critic, broadcaster, composer. He was born in Auckland, New Zealand and died in Wellington.

References

1907 births
1997 deaths
New Zealand broadcasters
New Zealand composers
Male composers
People from Auckland
20th-century composers
20th-century male musicians